is a passenger railway station in the town of Kyonan, Awa District, Chiba Prefecture, Japan, operated by East Japan Railway Company (JR East).

Lines

Station layout
The station consists of a single island platform one track, with one side of the platform fenced off. The station is unattended.

Platforms

History
Awa-Katsuyama Station opened on August 1, 1917. The station was absorbed into the JR East network upon the privatization of the Japanese National Railways (JNR) on April 1, 1987.

Passenger statistics
In fiscal 2018, the station was used by an average of 287 passengers daily (boarding passengers only).

Surrounding area

See also
 List of railway stations in Japan

References

External links

 JR East station information 

Railway stations in Chiba Prefecture
Railway stations in Japan opened in 1917
Uchibō Line
Kyonan
Stations of East Japan Railway Company